is C-ute's 13th single, released on August 25, 2010, on the Zetima label.

Track listing

CD single

Single V

Charts

Sales and certifications

References

External links 
 Profile on the Hello! Project official website
 Profile on the Up-Front Works official website

2010 singles
Japanese-language songs
Cute (Japanese idol group) songs
Songs written by Tsunku
Song recordings produced by Tsunku
Zetima Records singles
2010 songs